The design of road signs in Poland is regulated by Regulation of the Ministers of Infrastructure and Interior Affairs and Administration on road signs and signals. The Annex 1 to the regulation describes conditions related to usage of the road signs – size, visibility, colors and light reflections, typeface and text, criteria of choosing the type of foil to signs faces, colorful specimens and schematics.

Road signs are divided by two categories – "vertical" and "horizontal". The "vertical" signs (triangular, circular or rectangular) are placed on the side of the road or over the road. The "horizontal" are simply road markings painted on the carriageway, usually with white paint. The yellow paint is used on temporary situations, mostly during the road works. It has higher priority than white paint.

The road signs in Poland follow the Vienna Convention on Road Signs and Signals and, therefore, are more or less identical to those in other European countries. Warning signs have yellow background rather than the more common black-on-white design, and therefore similar to the road signs in Greece.

Polish road signs depict people with stylized (as opposed to naturalistic) silhouettes.

Meaning of the traffic signals and their usage is described in another regulation. Traffic signals are placed on the right side of the road, on the left side or over the carriageway. There are three types of traffic signals:

 signals made by traffic lights
 signals made by authorised personnel
 sound signals or vibrative

Vertical signs 
There are seven types of "vertical signs":

 Warning signs (type A) – triangular with the tip pointed upwards (with exception of sign A-7, where its tip is pointed downwards – it provides clear meaning of the sign even during the reduced readability or when looking on it from behind), with red border. The symbols are black on yellow background, with exception of sign A-29 which presents a three-colored traffic signals
 Prohibition signs (type B) – circular with red border. Black (in some cases colorful) symbol on white background (exceptions: sign B-20 "STOP", which has an octagonal shape – it also provides clear meaning even during reduced readability or when looking on it from behind; signs B-39, B-40 and B-44 are rectangular). In case of the signs that cancel specific restrictions the symbol is grey and crossed out by thick black diagonal line.
 Mandatory signs (type C) – circular, with a white symbol on blue background. The exception is C-17 sign (mandatory direction for vehicles carrying dangerous materials) which is placed on white rectangular board.
 Information signs (type D) – rectangular, blue (or with a white square on blue background) with a white, black or colorful symbol. There are few exceptions: D-1 and D-2 signs which are yellow on white background; additionally one of tips is pointed upwards to give the clear meaning like with A-7 and B-20 signs. D-42 to D-47 signs are big white rectangles.
 Directional signs (type E) – these signs have different shapes and colors, depending on the situation and placement.
 Complementary signs (type F) – big rectangular or square signs with blue or yellow background. These signs mostly inform about traffic order or approaching restrictions and dangers.
 Complementary plates (type T) – small rectangular signs, mostly with white or yellow background, with black text or symbol. These are placed under main sign, extending its meaning.

Depending on road type there are five groups of size:

 large (W) – used only on motorways
 big (D) – used on expressways, dual carriageway roads outside the built-up area and on roads inside the built-up area with maximum speed higher than 
 medium (S) – used on motorway slip roads, expressway slip roads, national roads, voivodeship roads and powiat roads, with exception of directional signs
 small (M) – used on gmina roads and as directional signs on powiat roads
 mini (MI) – used on traffic bollards, directional signs and inside the built-up areas when it's impossible to use larger signs or it would reduce visibility of pedestrians and on narrow streets.

Dimensions of directional signs are depending on size of letters, type and size of symbols and also by length and number of locality names.

To provide proper visibility and readability of road signs, the faces are made with reflective materials. Type of used material is dependent on road category.

Warning signs

Prohibitory signs 

To eliminate some of vehicle types from entering a specific road, two or exceptionally three symbols can be put on the sign, e.g.:

Mandatory signs 

Combined signs C-13 and C-16 mean a way that is designated only for pedestrians and bicycles. Below are possible variants of the sign:

Information signs

Directional signs

Complementary signs

Complementary plates

Additional signs

Additional signs before level crossing

Additional signs for tram drivers

Additional signs for bicycle routes

Additional signs for military vehicles drivers

Road markings

Traffic signals

Traffic signals for drivers and pedestrians

Traffic signals for drivers of public transport vehicles on regular routes

Traffic safety devices

References

External links 
 

Poland